Capital City is a television series which focused on the professional and personal lives of a group of investment bankers working in the dealing room at Shane Longman, a fictional international bank based in the City of London. The 23-episode series was produced by Euston Films, a wholly owned subsidiary of Thames Television, for the ITV network.

Thames Television spent an estimated £500,000 to run newspaper and billboard advertisements to promote the series' launch which at the time was believed to be the largest advertising spend for a programme in the history of ITV. Full-page advertisements were taken in six national newspapers including The Financial Times, The Times and The Independent. The ads promoted the Shane Longman "brand", rather than "Capital City", and featured images of cast members in character.

Thames Television stated that the press and poster ads were considered necessary to raise the profile of the series amongst members of the public who had a specialised or more professional interest, however a number of City bankers described the series as "fairly inaccurate", "confusing for the ordinary viewer", and lacking solid research. One television critic stated: "All of this would have been quite novel and exciting three years ago, but the world has turned, the market has crashed and we have all seen enough of other people's Porsches to last a lifetime... City hustlers do not look very heroic any more, just extravagantly paid."

Still, it could be argued that most of the characters in "Capital City" – perhaps with the exception of the reckless and predatory Jimmy Destry, power-hungry Lee Wolf and the duplicitous Sylvia Roux Teng – portray City bankers in a generally positive manner. The primary characters come across as likeable and – in contrast to the Gordon Gekko "greed is good" stereotype often associated with their industry – as possessing a moral and/or social conscience; in one episode, the entire dealing room threatens to go on strike in protest against handling a bond issue on behalf of a company which dumps toxic waste in poor African countries and demand that Shane Longman introduce policies which enable them to avoid dealing with clients who they regard as unethical.

Capital City is very much a product of the late 1980s, on the cusp of the digital revolution.  The dealing room computers used what appeared to be a DOS operating system; mobile phones were the size of bricks; the primary methods of long-distance "instant" communication were still the land line telephone, fax and telex; and smoking – banned in England, within most public buildings, in 2007 – was still allowed in the workplace as well as inside restaurants, bars and other public places. At the same time, the series dealt with several mature storylines including alcoholism, depression, mental illness, sexual assault, drug use, homosexuality, physical assault, gambling addiction, prostitution, promiscuity, shoplifting, fraud, bribery, corruption and abortion.

Cast
The main cast (in alphabetical order as shown in the series credits) included:

William Armstrong as Max Lubin 
Emily Bolton as Sylvia Roux Teng (from episode 13)
John Bowe as Leonard Ansen
Denys Hawthorne as James Farrell
Dorian Healy as Jimmy Destry (to episode 13)
Douglas Hodge as Declan McConnachie
Jason Isaacs as Chas Ewell
Joanna Kanska as Sirkka Nieminen
Richard LeParmentier as Lee Wolf
Trevyn McDowell as Michelle Hauptmann
Anna Nygh as Hannah Burgess
Joanna Phillips-Lane as Wendy Foley (to episode 14)
Rolf Saxon as Hudson J. Talbot III
Saira Todd as Hilary Rollinger (from episode 15)
Briony Glassco as Gail Martin

Recurring support and guest cast included Mark Burns as Peter Longman, grandson of the bank's founder, the eponymous Shane Longman, and 30 percent shareholder; Louise Lombard who appeared as Louise, a 17-year-old runaway who is befriended by Chas and is later assaulted by Jimmy; Faith Brook as Katherine Talbot, Hudson's mother; Charlotte Cornwell as Petra Allunson; Julia Ormond as Allison; Ben Daniels as Colin de Selincourt; and Pia Henderson, as Yolande, with whom Sirkka has a brief relationship.

Characters

Max Lubin (William Armstrong), the bank's unconventional and somewhat eccentric, pony tail-wearing Head of Swaps
Sylvia Roux Teng (Emily Bolton), replaces Wendy Foley as the bank's Chief Trader in episode 13; Sylvia's duplicitous nature is revealed when she mentions to City headhunter and personal friend, Petra Allunson, that the core members of the dealing room team – Declan McConnochie, Michelle Hauptmann, Sirkka Nieminen, Chas Ewell and their assistants – are unhappy and potentially "on the market"
Leonard Ansen (John Bowe), the Director of Banking Activities, who constantly clashes with the power-hungry Lee Wolf who regards the bank's dealers as reckless risk-takers; becomes romantically involved with Hannah Burgess after her marriage breaks down
James Farrell (Denys Hawthorne), the bank's Chief Executive Officer
Jimmy Destry (Dorian Healy), a maverick junior trader, nicknamed 'Squirt' by Declan McConnochie, who is sacked for malpractice in episode 13; Destry shares a flat with Chas Ewell but the two fall out after Destry molests Louise, a 17-year-old runaway who Chas befriends at a railway station, in episode 4
Declan McConnachie (Douglas Hodge), a senior trader on the secondary desk; becomes romantically involved with Michelle Hauptmann, who he marries in the final episode
Chas Ewell (Jason Isaacs), a junior trader on the primary desk, who questions his role in the city during a personal crisis in series one
Sirkka Nieminen (Joanna Kanska), a senior trader in the secondary desk; the character is originally from Finland (though the actress is Polish) and experiences numerous personal crises during the series including a battle with alcoholism, an abortion and a lesbian affair; she is a serial risk-taker and thrill-seeker who, during episode 11, represents herself as a high-class prostitute on at least two occasions; during the series it is revealed that Sirkka and Declan McConnochie were romantically involved at one stage in the past
Lee Wolf (Richard LeParmentier), the Director of Corporate Finance, who constantly clashes with Leonard Ansen over the role of the banks dealers, who Wolf regards as reckless risk-takers
Michelle Hauptmann (Trevyn McDowell), a 24-year-old senior trader on the primary desk; she is originally from Germany and becomes romantically involved with Declan McConnachie during series one; the two marry in the final episode at the end of series two
Hannah Burgess (Anna Nygh), responsible for overseeing the dealing room IT and computer systems; Australian-born; she becomes romantically involved with Leonard Ansen after she and her husband Ryan divorce
Wendy Foley (Joanna Phillips-Lane), initially the Chief Trader, Wendy is promoted to become the new Head of Derivatives in episode 13 and is replaced on the dealing room floor by Sylvia Roux Teng; she resigns from the bank in episode 14 to work with major shareholder Peter Longman
Hudson J. Talbot III (Rolf Saxon), a US-born attorney and the bank's capital markets originator whose mentally unwell wife Alex leaves him and their infant son in episode 1
Hilary Rollinger (Saira Todd), a 22-year-old graduate who excelled in economics and philosophy; joins Shane Longman in episode 15 to assist Michelle Hauptmann on the primary desk; during the office party celebrating the impending nuptials of Michelle and Declan, a very tipsy Hilary manages to tell Declan what a sweet and sexy guy he is, much to everyone's amusement as they look on from the table

Episode detail

Series 1 (1989)

Series 2 (1990)

Production credits
Creator: Andrew Maclear
Writers: Andrew Maclear, Matthew Bardsley, Charles Jennings, Tom Greenwood, Richard O'Keefe
Directors: Mike Vardy, Sarah Hellings, Paul Seed, Robert Walker, Clive Fleury, Diarmuid Lawrence
Associate Producer: Ron Purdie
Executive Producers: Andrew Brown, John Hambley
Producer: Irving Teitelbaum
Music: Colin Towns

Series trivia

The series was created by Andrew Maclear, who also wrote the 1989 movie Dealers; the film's dealing room set, which reportedly cost £1,000,000 to construct, was retained for use in "Capital City". The dealing room equipment was provided by Reuters Limited.
Exterior scenes were shot throughout London and landmarks such as Big Ben, the Palace of Westminster, Tower Bridge, River Thames and St Paul's Cathedral appeared as backdrops. Coincidentally, stylised forms of these icons were also featured in the on-air idents for Euston Films' parent company, Thames Television, that were shown at the end of each episode.
It is estimated that Euston Films spent more than US$10 million to produce the first 13 episodes (series one)
The music for the series was composed by Colin Towns and enjoyed some success in its own right.
The bank's address is shown in an Attachment of Earnings Order (Judgment Debt) served on Lee Wolf as 8 Gracewell Street, London EC2; Wolf's address is shown in the same document as 56 Chalfont Court, 238 Baker Street, London NW1. Neither address actually exists.
Shane Longman's headquarters are located near the Bank of England; in one episode Michelle Hauptmann loses her driver's licence for one year after being caught speeding in her Porsche and is shown exiting the London Underground at Bank station after catching the Tube to work.
In the final episode, Michelle and Declan are married and, in the closing scenes, are shown travelling by water taxi to the airport en route to their honeymoon in Venice; their marriage is taken to have occurred 1 September 1990 as this is the date shown on their travel documents.

Series quotes

Sylvia Roux Teng to Hilary Rollinger: "Your job involves more than being a smile and dial girl."
James Farrell to (the newly married) Declan and Michelle McConnochie: "In 30 years of banking, this is the happiest merger I've ever seen", to which Declan replies: "James, this isn't a merger. This is a takeover."

Broadcast information
Capital City was originally broadcast on Thames Television between 26 September 1989 and 20 December 1990; many other ITV regions also carried the programme, though participation and broadcast dates have varied. Despite its short run in the UK, the series was rebroadcast on UKTV Gold.

The series was also transmitted in Australia by ABC Television, in the United States on selected public television stations, and in Canada on CBC Television, as well as on networks in Switzerland, Germany and Poland.

Availability
The complete series of 23 episodes have been released on DVD.

See also
 Traders, a Canadian drama also involving investment bankers

References

External links

ITV television dramas
Television shows set in London
1989 British television series debuts
1990 British television series endings
1980s British drama television series
1990s British drama television series
Television shows produced by Thames Television
Television series by Fremantle (company)
English-language television shows
Television series by Euston Films